Yelizovo is a town in Kamchatka Krai, Russia, located on the Avacha River  northwest of Petropavlovsk-Kamchatsky. Population:

History
Founded in 1848 as the selo of Stary Ostrog, it was renamed Zavoyko in 1897, after the Russian admiral Vasily Zavoyko who led the defense of Petropavlovsk in 1854. The village was renamed Yelizovo in 1924. Urban-type settlement status was granted to it in 1964, and town status was granted in 1975.

Administrative and municipal status
Within the framework of administrative divisions, Yelizovo serves as the administrative center of Yelizovsky District, even though it is not a part of it. As an administrative division, it is incorporated as Yelizovo Town Under Krai Jurisdiction—an administrative unit with the status equal to that of the districts. As a municipal division, Yelizovo Town Under Krai Jurisdiction is incorporated as Yelizovskoye Urban Settlement within Yelizovsky Municipal District.

Demographics
Ethnic composition (2010):
 Russians – 89.4%
 Ukrainians – 3.5%
 Koreans – 1.5%
 Tatars – 0.6%
 Belarusians – 0.6%
 Others – 4.4%

Transportation and infrastructure
The town's most notable claim to fame is serving as the host for Petropavlovsk-Kamchatsky Airport, the largest airport on Kamchatka. A major Soviet space telemetry station, NIP-6, was also located nearby.

References

Notes

Sources

External links 

Cities and towns in Kamchatka Krai
1848 establishments in the Russian Empire
Socialist planned cities